The Gaudeamus International Interpreters Award has been offered since 1963 by the Gaudeamus Foundation to outstanding young performers winning the International Gaudemus Competition for Interpreters of Contemporary Music (Anon. 2001). The competition provides an opportunity for performers of contemporary music to meet other musicians from all over the world. During the festival workshops, master classes and concerts take place.

First Prize winners
 1963 1st Prize not awarded
 1964 Duo Petr Messiereur (Czechoslovakia, violin) and Jarmila Kozderková (Czechoslovakia, piano)
 1965 Charles de Wolff (Netherlands, organ)
 1966 Harald Boje (Germany, piano)
 1967 Duo Joan Ryall (United Kingdom, piano) and June Clark (United Kingdom, piano)
 1968 Ronald Lumsden (United Kingdom, piano)
 1969 Frank van Kooten (Netherlands, oboe)
 1970 Bart Berman (Netherlands, piano)
 1971 Doris Hays (United States, piano)
 1972 Harry Sparnaay (Netherlands, bass clarinet)
 1973 Michiko Takahashi (Japan, marimba)
 1974 Herbert Henck (Germany, piano)
 1975 Fernando Grillo (Italy, contrabass)
 1976 Max Lifchitz (Mexico, piano)
 1977 Toyoji Peter Tomita (United States, trombone)
 1978 Edward Johnson (United States, clarinet)
 1979 Mircea Ardeleanu (Romania, percussion)
 1980 Florean Popa (Romania, clarinet)
 1981 David Arden (United States, piano)
 1982 Anthony de Mare (United States, piano)
 1983 John Kenny (United Kingdom, trombone)
 1985 Amadinda Percussion Group (Hungary, percussion)
 1987 Stefan Hussong (Germany, accordion)
 1989 Louis Bessette (Canada, piano)
 1991 Tomoko Mukaiyama (Japan, piano)
 1993 Aleksandra Krzanowska (Poland, piano)
 1994 Margit Kern (Germany, accordion)
 1995 Guido Arbonelli (Italy, bass clarinet)
 1996 Helen Bledsoe (United States, flute)
 1997 Alan Thomas (United States, guitar)
 1999 Ralph van Raat (Netherlands, piano)
 2001 Tony Arnold (United States, soprano)
 2003 Philip Howard (United Kingdom, piano)
 2005 Ashley Hribar (Australia, piano)
 2007 Mathias Reumert (Denmark, percussion)
 2009 Małgorzata Walentynowicz (Poland, piano)
 2011 Brian Archinal (United States, percussion)

Sources
Anon. 2001. "Gaudeamus Foundation". The New Grove Dictionary of Music and Musicians, second edition, edited by Stanley Sadie and John Tyrrell. London: Macmillan Publishers.

See also
 Gaudeamus International Composers Award

External links
Review of the Gaudeamus Interpreters Competition of 2001, also gives some general background

Dutch music awards
Lists of award winners
Gaudeamus Foundation